A drowning pit, drowning pool, murder-pool or murder hole (not to be confused with defensive murder holes) was a well or pond specifically for executing women and girls (for males the gibbet was used) under Scottish feudal laws. Rivers or lochans were used if conveniently situated near to a moot hill, where the baronial court dempster would announce the death penalty. The term fossa was also used, as in the phrase ‘furca and fossa’.

Introduction
Drowning pits came into legal use after it was enacted at the parliament assembled in Forfar in 1057 by King Malcolm Canmore that every baron should sink a well or pit, for the drowning of females. The place name element 'murder hole' sometime relates to these formal drowning sites. Bones have been found close to some of these sites, suggesting that the corpses were buried close by and not in hallowed ground.

Some drowning pits had ladders down which the condemned person had to climb; the ladder was then withdrawn. On other sites hurdles were used to hold the person below the water. Many moot hill sites are or were surrounded by water or were situated at the edge of a body of water, such as Mugdock, Mound Wood near Auchentiber and the Court Hill at the Hill of Beith, Hutt Knowe at Bonshaw, etc.

It is not clear why men were more likely to be hanged and women drowned in a fen, river, pit, or murder hole. However, it may relate to ideas of decency or because it was a less violent death.

Feudal jurisdiction
The binomial expression pit and gallows or – reversing the terms – furca and fossa refers to the high justice rights of a feudal baron, etc., including the capital penalty. The right is described in full as pit and gallows, sake and soke, toll, team, and infangthief.

It is said that King Malcolm Canmore legislated in 1057 that every barony was to have a tree for hanging convicted men and a pit of water for the execution of convicted women.

Although drowning was generally reserved for females, being the least brutal form of death penalty, at times a male was executed in this way as a matter of favour, for instance in 1526 a man convicted of theft and sacrilege was ordered to be drowned "by the queen's special grace" and in 1611 a man was drowned at Edinburgh for stealing a lamb.

The hereditary right of high justice survived until 1747 when it was removed from the barons and from the holders of Regalities and sheriffdoms, by the Heritable Jurisdictions (Scotland) Act 1746, however the use of the death penalty by barons had largely fallen into abeyance well before it was abolished. Its last use in Scotland may have been in 1685, the year of the drowning of the Wigton martyrs.

Examples of murder holes
These pits were often close to the residence of the baron or clan chief, and many gallows sites were close to water. A pit or ditch therefore generally did not have to be constructed, making actual drowning pits rare features within the physical landscape. It is not clear what the ratio of male-to-female deaths was in feudal times. Many gallows sites are also associated with the discovery of bones; however records do not clearly state the sex.

Gallows Hill, in the parish of Cruden, was where criminals were executed and where human skeletons have been found. A deep pool in the Water of Cruden opposite is where 'others' were drowned.

There was a Drowning Pool, at Balliemore, Strathspey, South-east of Inverness, where it is said that witches and other women criminals used to be put to death.

Between Mugdock Castle and Craigend is a round knoll, called the moot hill (place of judgement). Guilty women were drowned in the little sheet of water which lay at the foot of the gibbet where the men were hanged.

In Straiton parish near Craigenrae is a site known as the murder hole, represented by a marshy depression. In the novel The Grey Man written by S. R. Crockett this murder hole is used, however its site is placed elsewhere.

On the Water of Minnoch is a deep pool known as the Murder Hole in which a family from Rowantree dumped their victims; they were caught, confessed and were the last to be hanged on the dule tree.

The author Joseph Train records, however, that at the last shire-mote ever held in Carrick by the Earl of Cassillis, the MacKillups of Craingenreach were hanged on the dule tree of Cassillis circa 1746, having murdered a neighbour and thrown his remains into "the common murder hole of the Bailiery at Craigenreach".

Drowning pits elsewhere in Britain
The owner of Baynard's Castle, London, in the reign of John, had powers of trying criminals, and his descendants long afterwards claimed the privileges, the most valued of which was the right of drowning in the River Thames traitors taken within their jurisdiction. Drowning was the punishment ordained by Richard the Lionheart for any soldier of his army who killed a fellow crusader during the passage to the Holy Land.

See also

References 
Notes

Sources
 Love, Dane (2003). Ayrshire : Discovering a County. Ayr : Fort Publishing. .
 Love, Dane (2009). Legendary Ayrshire. Custom : Folklore : Tradition. Auchinleck : Carn Publishing. 
 Train, Joseph (1844). The Dule Tree of Cassillis. The Ayrshire Wreath MDCCCXLIV. Kilmarnock : R. Crawford & Son.

External links
 Video on Feudal Scotland Drowning Pits, Gallows Hills and Moot Hills

Capital punishment in the United Kingdom

Execution equipment